Laetolia is an extinct genus of galagid primates from the Pliocene of Tanzania. It contains one species, L. sadimanensis, which is known from several dentary fragments discovered in the Upper Laetolil Beds of Laetoli. It was originally described in 1987 as a species of Galago, but a separate genus was erected for it in 2011.

References 

Galagidae
Prehistoric strepsirrhines
Prehistoric primate genera
Pliocene primates
Pliocene mammals of Africa
Fossils of Tanzania
Fossil taxa described in 2011